Kuktong Airport is an airport near Kŭktong-rodongjagu in Myonggan County, Hamgyong-bukto, North Korea.

Facilities 
The airfield has a single grass runway 10/28 measuring 3750 x 164 feet (1143 x 50 m).  It on the east coast of North Korea, approximately 20 km south of Orang Airport.

References 

Airports in North Korea
North Hamgyong